Kärleken & livet is a 2012 studio album by Elisabeth Andreassen, and a tribute to Rolf Løvland.

Låtlista
Kärleken och livet
Mitt land (My Land)
Alt du er for meg (Song from a Secret garden / The Things You are to Me)
Ta meg heim (Greenwaves)
Fyll ditt hjärta (Raise your Voices)
Duett
Havet
Danse mot vår
Sang i en stormfull natt (Song for a Stormy Night)
Första sommaren (Celebration)
Du ga meg en vår
Rör vid min själ (You Raise Me Up)
La det swinge (Orsa Spelmän)

Charts

References 

2012 albums
Elisabeth Andreassen albums